Direct Visual Feedback is a method of training used in both practical and rehabilitative settings where the attention of the trainee is tied to an external visual cue in reference to the particular movement, motor function or exercise that is being performed by the trainee. 

The principle to Bio-Feedback is very similar to DVF.  Bio-Feedback, which is a process that enables an individual to learn how to change physiological activity for the purposes of improving health and performance by receiving rapid feedback from precise instruments which are measuring physiological activity such as brainwaves, heart function, breathing, muscle activity, and skin temperature. 

Direct Visual Feedback's method applies more directly to improving exterior physical health and performance. Instead of using technically advanced measuring instruments for feedback, DVF relies on the human eye. One method that has been used to test DVF is by placing a laser beam on the hand and connecting it to a monitor, when the trainee raises his arm from waist height to shoulder height he is focused on the external reference showing exactly what path the arm took from point A(waist height) to point B(shoulder height). Studies have shown that not only is a higher level of performance often achieved faster with an external rather than an internal attention focus, but the skill is retained better.

See also 
 Functional training

References 

Medical image computing and computer-assisted intervention:
 MICCAI 2004, 7th international conference, Saint-Malo, France, September 26–29, 2004
 Hutchinson S., G. D. Hager and P. I. Corke, A Tutorial on Visual Servo Control. IEEE Trans. on Robotics and Automation, Vol. 12, No. 5, October 1996, pp. 651–670.

External links 
 Laser Gym website article
 Urology robotics
 
 Biofeedback

Biofeedback
Physiology